The 2022–23 Denver Nuggets season is the 47th season for the franchise in the National Basketball Association (NBA).

Draft 

The Nuggets own their first round pick; their second-round pick was traded to Minnesota via Philadelphia.

Roster

Standings

Division

Conference

Game log

Preseason 

|-style="background:#fcc"
| 1
| October 3rd
| Oklahoma City
| 
| Zeke Nnaji (15)
| Nnaji, Jordan (6)
| Jokić, Green (3)
| Ball Arena12,432
| 0–1
|-style="background:#fcc"
| 2
| October 7th
| @ Chicago
| 
| Bones Hyland (24)
| DeAndre Jordan (10)
| Murray, Smith (5)
| United Center20,305
| 0–2
|-style="background:#cfc"
| 3
| October 10th
| Phoenix
| 
| Ish Smith (17)
| DeAndre Jordan (10)
| Ish Smith (7)
| Ball Arena12,505
| 1–2
|-style="background:#cfc"
| 4
| October 12th
| @ L.A. Clippers
| 
| Ish Smith (15)
| Zeke Nnaji (8)
| Ish Smith (8)
| Toyota Arena8,812
| 2–2
|-style="background:#cfc"
| 5
| October 14th
| @ Golden State
| 
| Bones Hyland (18)
| Aaron Gordon (12)
| Aaron Gordon (7)
| Chase CenterN/A
| 3–2

Regular season

|-style="background:#fcc;
| 1
| October 19
| @ Utah
| 
| Nikola Jokić (27)
| Aaron Gordon (10)
| Jokić, Caldwell-Pope (6)
| Vivint Arena18,206
| 0–1
|-style="background:#cfc"
| 2
| October 21
| @ Golden State
| 
| Nikola Jokić (26)
| Nikola Jokić (12)
| Nikola Jokić (10)
| Chase Center18,064
| 1–1
|-style="background:#cfc"
| 3
| October 22
| Oklahoma City
| 
| Michael Porter Jr. (22)
| Nikola Jokić (16)
| Nikola Jokić (13)
| Ball Arena19,983
| 2–1
|-style="background:#fcc"
| 4
| October 24
| @ Portland
| 
| Aaron Gordon (26)
| Nikola Jokić (9)
| Nikola Jokić (9)
| Moda Center18,111
| 2–2
|-style="background:#cfc"
| 5
| October 26
| L.A. Lakers
| 
| Nikola Jokić (31)
| Nikola Jokić (13)
| Nikola Jokić (9)
| Ball Arena19,520
| 3–2
|-style="background:#cfc"
| 6
| October 28
| Utah
| 
| Bones Hyland (26)
| Jordan, Porter Jr. (13)
| Nikola Jokić (6)
| Ball Arena19,560
| 4–2
|-style="background:#fcc;
| 7
| October 30
| @ L.A. Lakers
| 
| Nikola Jokić (23)
| Nikola Jokić (14)
| Nikola Jokić (6)
| Crypto.com Arena18,997
| 4–3

|-style="background:#cfc"
| 8
| November 3
| @ Oklahoma City
| 
| Aaron Gordon (27)
| Nikola Jokić (13)
| Nikola Jokić (14)
| Paycom Center13,791
| 5–3
|-style="background:#cfc"
| 9
| November 5
| San Antonio
| 
| Bones Hyland (24)
| Michael Porter Jr. (9)
| Nikola Jokić (10)
| Ball Arena19,641
| 6–3
|-style="background:#cfc"
| 10
| November 7
| @ San Antonio
| 
| Nikola Jokić (26)
| Jokić, Jordan (8)
| Nikola Jokić (10)
| AT&T Center11,574
| 7–3
|-style="background:#cfc"
| 11
| November 9
| @ Indiana
| 
| Nikola Jokić (24)
| Aaron Gordon (17)
| Gordon, Jokić (6)
| Gainbridge Fieldhouse14,069
| 8–3
|-style="background:#fcc;
| 12
| November 11
| @ Boston
| 
| Nikola Jokić (29)
| Bruce Brown (10)
| Jamal Murray (10)
| TD Garden19,156
| 8–4
|-style="background:#cfc"
| 13
| November 13
| @ Chicago
| 
| Michael Porter Jr. (31)
| Bruce Brown (11)
| Nikola Jokić (14)
| United Center21,602
| 9–4
|-style="background:#fcc;
| 14
| November 16
| New York
| 
| Hyland, Murray (21)
| Jamal Murray (9)
| Jamal Murray (6)
| Ball Arena18,210
| 9–5
|-style="background:#fcc;
| 15
| November 18
| @ Dallas
| 
| Brown, Caldwell-Pope (18)
| DeAndre Jordan (7)
| Bruce Brown (7)
| American Airlines Center20,135
| 9–6
|-style="background:#cfc"
| 16
| November 20
| @ Dallas
| 
| Bones Hyland (29)
| DeAndre Jordan (17)
| Bruce Brown (8)
| American Airlines Center20,244
| 10–6
|-style="background:#fcc;
| 17
| November 22
| Detroit
| 
| Nikola Jokić (31)
| Nikola Jokić (9)
| Nikola Jokić (10)
| Ball Arena19,635
| 10–7
|-style="background:#cfc"
| 18
| November 23
| @ Oklahoma City
| 
| Nikola Jokić (39)
| Bruce Brown (13)
| Bruce Brown (10)
| Paycom Center13,656
| 11–7
|-style="background:#cfc"
| 19
| November 25
| @ L.A. Clippers
| 
| Aaron Gordon (29)
| Nikola Jokić (13)
| Jamal Murray (9)
| Crypto.com Arena16,559
| 12–7
|-style="background:#cfc"
| 20
| November 28
| Houston
| 
| Nikola Jokić (32)
| Nikola Jokić (12)
| Jokić, Smith (8)
| Ball Arena16,027
| 13–7
|-style="background:#cfc"
| 21
| November 30
| Houston
| 
| Jamal Murray (26)
| Nikola Jokić (9)
| Nikola Jokić (12)
| Ball Arena16,286
| 14–7

|-style="background:#fcc;
| 22
| December 2
| @ Atlanta
| 
| Nikola Jokić (24)
| Nikola Jokić (10)
| Nikola Jokić (8)
| State Farm Arena16,974
| 14–8
|-style="background:#fcc;
| 23
| December 4
| @ New Orleans
| 
| Nikola Jokić (32)
| Nikola Jokić (16)
| Nikola Jokić (9)
| Smoothie King Center15,658
| 14–9
|-style="background:#fcc;
| 24
| December 6
| Dallas
| 
| Aaron Gordon (27)
| Gordon, Jokić (8)
| Nikola Jokić (8)
| Ball Arena19,520
| 14–10
|-style="background:#cfc;
| 25
| December 8
| @ Portland
| 
| Nikola Jokić (33)
| Nikola Jokić (10)
| Nikola Jokić (9)
| Moda Center18,189
| 15–10
|-style="background:#cfc;
| 26
| December 10
| Utah
| 
| Nikola Jokić (31)
| Nikola Jokić (12)
| Nikola Jokić (14)
| Ball Arena19,636
| 16–10
|-style="background:#cfc;
| 27
| December 14
| Washington
| 
| Nikola Jokić (43)
| Nikola Jokić (14)
| Nikola Jokić (8)
| Ball Arena19,550
| 17–10
|-style="background:#fcc;
| 28
| December 16
| @ L.A. Lakers
| 
| Nikola Jokić (25)
| Nikola Jokić (11)
| Nikola Jokić (8)
| Crypto.com Arena18,505
| 17–11
|-style="background:#cfc;
| 29
| December 18
| Charlotte
| 
| Nikola Jokić (40)
| Nikola Jokić (27)
| Jamal Murray (11)
| Ball Arena19,235
| 18–11
|-style="background:#cfc;
| 30
| December 20
| Memphis
| 
| Aaron Gordon (24)
| Nikola Jokić (13)
| Nikola Jokić (13)
| Ball Arena19,605
| 19–11
|-style="background:#cfc;
| 31
| December 23
| Portland
| 
| Nikola Jokić (29)
| Jokić, Murray (8)
| Jamal Murray (12)
| Ball Arena19,619
| 20–11
|-style="background:#cfc;
| 32
| December 25
| Phoenix
| 
| Nikola Jokić (41)
| Nikola Jokić (15)
| Nikola Jokić (15)
| Ball Arena19,642
| 21–11
|-style="background:#cfc;
| 33
| December 27
| @ Sacramento
| 
| Michael Porter Jr. (30)
| Nikola Jokić (9)
| Nikola Jokić (11)
| Golden 1 Center17,937
| 22–11
|-style="background:#fcc;
| 34
| December 28
| @ Sacramento
| 
| Nikola Jokić (40)
| Jokić, Jordan, Porter Jr. (7)
| Bones Hyland (11)
| Golden 1 Center17,985
| 22–12
|-style="background:#cfc;
| 35
| December 30
| Miami
| 
| Kentavious Caldwell-Pope (20)
| Nikola Jokić (12)
| Nikola Jokić (12)
| Ball Arena19,638
| 23–12

|-style="background:#cfc;
| 36
| January 1
| Boston
| 
| Nikola Jokić (30)
| Nikola Jokić (12)
| Nikola Jokić (12)
| Ball Arena19,641
| 24–12
|-style="background:#fcc;
| 37
| January 2
| @ Minnesota
| 
| Nikola Jokić (24)
| Aaron Gordon (16)
| Nikola Jokić (9)
| Target Center15,962
| 24–13
|-style="background:#cfc;
| 38
| January 5
| L.A. Clippers
| 
| Jamal Murray (18)
| Vlatko Čančar (12)
| Nikola Jokić (9)
| Ball Arena19,087
| 25–13
|-style="background:#cfc;
| 39
| January 6
| Cleveland
| 
| Nikola Jokić (28)
| Nikola Jokić (15)
| Nikola Jokić (10)
| Ball Arena19,638
| 26–13
|-style="background:#cfc;
| 40
| January 9
| L.A. Lakers
| 
| Jamal Murray (34)
| Nikola Jokić (11)
| Nikola Jokić (16)
| Ball Arena19,609
| 27–13
|-style="background:#cfc;
| 41
| January 11
| Phoenix
| 
| Hyland, Jokić (21)
| Nikola Jokić (18)
| Nikola Jokić (9)
| Ball Arena18,872
| 28–13
|-style="background:#cfc;
| 42
| January 13
| @ L.A. Clippers
| 
| Jamal Murray (24)
| Jamal Murray (8)
| Aaron Gordon (5)
| Crypto.com Arena16,005
| 29–13
|-style="background:#cfc;
| 43
| January 15
| Orlando
| 
| Aaron Gordon (25)
| Nikola Jokić (10)
| Nikola Jokić (14)
| Ball Arena19,641
| 30–13
|-style="background:#cfc;
| 44
| January 17
| Portland
| 
| Nikola Jokić (36)
| Nikola Jokić (12)
| Nikola Jokić (10)
| Ball Arena18,258
| 31–13
|-style="background:#cfc;
| 45
| January 18
| Minnesota
| 
| Nikola Jokić (31)
| Nikola Jokić (11)
| Nikola Jokić (13)
| Ball Arena16,112
| 32–13
|-style="background:#cfc;
| 46
| January 20
| Indiana
| 
| Aaron Gordon (28)
| Jamal Murray (10)
| Jamal Murray (14)
| Ball Arena19,609
| 33–13
|-style="background:#fcc;
| 47
| January 22
| Oklahoma City
| 
| Jamal Murray (26)
| Gordon, Nnaji (10)
| Jamal Murray (9)
| Ball Arena19,557
| 33–14
|-style="background:#cfc;
| 48
| January 24
| @ New Orleans
| 
| Jokić, Murray (25)
| Nikola Jokić (11)
| Nikola Jokić (10)
| Smoothie King Center14,699
| 34–14
|-style="background:#fcc;
| 49
| January 25
| @ Milwaukee
| 
| Aaron Gordon (24)
| Aaron Gordon (14)
| Brown, Gordon (4)
| Fiserv Forum17,352
| 34–15
|-style="background:#fcc;
| 50
| January 28
| @ Philadelphia
| 
| Nikola Jokić (24)
| Nikola Jokić (8)
| Nikola Jokić (9)
| Wells Fargo Center21,255
| 34–16
|-style="background:#cfc;
| 51
| January 31
| New Orleans
| 
| Jamal Murray (32)
| Nikola Jokić (18)
| Nikola Jokić (15)
| Ball Arena18,868
| 35–16

|-style="background:#cfc;
| 52
| February 2
| Golden State
| 
| Jamal Murray (33)
| Nikola Jokić (14)
| Nikola Jokić (16)
| Ball Arena19,555
| 36–16
|-style="background:#cfc;
| 53
| February 4
| Atlanta
| 
| Jamal Murray (41)
| Nikola Jokić (18)
| Nikola Jokić (10)
| Ball Arena19,630
| 37–16
|-style="background:#fcc;
| 54
| February 5
| @ Minnesota
| 
| Michael Porter Jr. (22)
| Ish Smith (7)
| Bruce Brown (7)
| Target Center17,136
| 37–17
|-style="background:#cfc;
| 55
| February 7
| Minnesota
| 
| Michael Porter Jr. (30)
| Nikola Jokić (12)
| Nikola Jokić (16)
| Ball Arena18,307
| 38–17
|-style="background:#fcc;
| 56
| February 9
| @ Orlando
| 
| Aaron Gordon (37)
| Aaron Gordon (14)
| Nikola Jokić (6)
| Amway Center18,846
| 38–18
|-style="background:#cfc;
| 57
| February 11
| @ Charlotte
| 
| Nikola Jokić (30)
| Nikola Jokić (16)
| Nikola Jokić (10)
| Spectrum Center19,256
| 39–18
|-style="background:#cfc;
| 58
| February 13
| @ Miami
| 
| Nikola Jokić (27)
| Nikola Jokić (12)
| Nikola Jokić (8)
| Miami-Dade Arena19,755
| 40–18
|-style="background:#cfc;
| 59
| February 15
| Dallas
| 
| Jeff Green (24)
| Nikola Jokić (13)
| Nikola Jokić (10)
| Ball Arena19,627
| 41–18
|- align="center"
|colspan="9" bgcolor="#bbcaff"|All-Star Break
|-style="background:#cfc;
| 60
| February 23
| @ Cleveland
| 
| Michael Porter Jr. (25)
| Nikola Jokić (18)
| Nikola Jokić (13)
| Rocket Mortgage FieldHouse19,432
| 42–18
|-style="background:#fcc;
| 61
| February 25
| @ Memphis
| 
| Nikola Jokić (15)
| Nikola Jokić (13)
| Jamal Murray (4)
| FedExForum18,302
| 42–19
|-style="background:#cfc;
| 62
| February 26
| L.A. Clippers
| 
| Nikola Jokić (40)
| Nikola Jokić (17)
| Jamal Murray (12)
| Ball Arena 19,689
| 43–19
|-style="background:#cfc;
| 63
| February 28
| @ Houston
| 
| Jamal Murray (33)
| Nikola Jokić (11)
| Nikola Jokić (10)
| Toyota Center 15,368
| 44–19

|-style="background:#cfc;
| 64
| March 3
| Memphis
| 
| Michael Porter Jr. (26)
| Nikola Jokić (18)
| Nikola Jokić (10)
| Ball Arena 19,641
| 45–19
|-style="background:#cfc;
| 65
| March 6
| Toronto
| 
| Jamal Murray (24)
| Nikola Jokić (13)
| Nikola Jokić (9)
| Ball Arena19,520
| 46–19
|-style="background:#fcc;
| 66
| March 8
| Chicago
| 
| Nikola Jokić (18)
| Nikola Jokić (12)
| Nikola Jokić (8)
| Ball Arena 19,896
| 46–20
|-style="background:#fcc;
| 67
| March 10
| @ San Antonio
| 
| Nikola Jokić (37)
| Nikola Jokić (11)
| Nikola Jokić (11)
| AT&T Center 18,354
| 46–21
|-style="background:#fcc;
| 68
| March 12
| Brooklyn
| 
| Nikola Jokić (35)
| Nikola Jokić (20)
| Nikola Jokić (11)
| Ball Arena 19,739
| 46–22
|-style="background:#fcc;
| 69
| March 14
| @ Toronto
| 
| Nikola Jokić (28)
| Nikola Jokić (8)
| Jamal Murray (9)
| Scotiabank Arena 19,800
| 46–23
|-style="background:#cfc;
| 70
| March 16
| @ Detroit
| 
| Nikola Jokić (30)
| Nikola Jokić (10)
| Jamal Murray (10)
| Little Caesars Arena 17,987
| 47–23
|-style="background:#fcc;
| 71
| March 18
| @ New York
| 
| Jamal Murray (25)
| Nikola Jokić (10)
| Nikola Jokić (8)
| Madison Square Garden 19,812
| 47–24
|-style="background:#cfc;
| 72
| March 19
| @ Brooklyn
| 
| Michael Porter Jr. (28)
| Nikola Jokić (17)
| Nikola Jokić (10)
| Barclays Center 18,235
| 48–24
|-
| 73
| March 22
| @ Washington
| 
| 
| 
| 
| Capital One Arena 
| –
|-
| 74
| March 25
| Milwaukee
| 
| 
| 
| 
| Ball Arena 
| –
|-
| 75
| March 27
| Philadelphia
| 
| 
| 
| 
| Ball Arena 
| –
|-
| 76
| March 30
| New Orleans
| 
| 
| 
| 
| Ball Arena 
| –
|-
| 77
| March 31
| @ Phoenix
| 
| 
| 
| 
| Footprint Center 
| –

|-
| 78
| April 2
| Golden State
| 
| 
| 
| 
| Ball Arena 
| –
|-
| 79
| April 4
| @ Houston
| 
| 
| 
| 
| Toyota Center 
| –
|-
| 80
| April 6
| @ Phoenix
| 
| 
| 
| 
| Footprint Center 
| –
|-
| 81
| April 8
| @ Utah
| 
| 
| 
| 
| Vivint Arena 
| –
|-
| 82
| April 9
| Sacramento
| 
| 
| 
| 
| Ball Arena 
| –

Transactions

Overview

Trades

Free agency

Re-signed

Additions

Subtractions

Notes

References 

Denver Nuggets seasons
Denver Nuggets
Denver Nuggets
Denver Nuggets